The Panther TT Entrant was a British motorcycle made in 1924 by Phelon & Moore and was the first to carry the name "Panther". With a number of wins in other races and trials, it was decided to enter the new machine into the Isle of Man TT. Whilst originally intended to be stock, these models were modified for the purpose and in later years TT Replica machines were catalogued, however there is no record of any machines being  sold to the public. The TT Entrant machines had a 25 bhp 498cc, 6.5:1 compression ratio, 84 x 90 mm, ohv sloper engine. Launched in 1924, TT Entrants were made through to 1928.

Development 
The TT Entrants were based on the new Panther machine, launched in 1924.

1927 - No works entrant to the TT, only a private entrant.

1928 - (a.k.a. Model 4 or 4a) Sumpless 490 cc engine with external pushrods and a P&M four-speed close ratio gearbox

Technical Information

Engine Numbers 
Engine Numbers in this period are a matter of uncertainty.

Sources

External links
Racing Panthers at The Panther Page

TT Entrant